N'Tjila is a village and seat of the commune of Wateni in the Cercle of Sikasso in the Sikasso Region of southern Mali. It is 94 km west-northwest of Sikasso.

References

Populated places in Sikasso Region